LeTourneau Technologies, Inc. was an American manufacturer of heavy construction equipment founded by R. G. LeTourneau. In 2011, the company was acquired by Joy Global.

History

R. G. LeTourneau, also the founder of LeTourneau University, founded R. G. LeTourneau, Inc. in 1929 in California as a contractor of earthmoving equipment. LeTourneau manufactured products in Longview, Texas.

During World War II, the company provided 70% of the Allies' earthmoving equipment. In 1954, it built the first jack-up drilling rig. In 1955, it made the first log-stacker machine. In 1965, the company made the first straddle carrier.

LeTourneau had spent the early 1950s perfecting a sort of diesel-electric drivetrain for multi-wheeled heavy-machinery. The system – somewhat similar in concept to the sort used on many locomotives – used a combustion engine to spin an electric generator. This generator would send its power to hub motors mounted to each wheel of the vehicle, allowing for multi-wheel-drive without differentials, driveshafts, or the drivetrain losses associated with them. 

For the Dew Line project, Western Electric and Alaska Freightlines, with the help of TRADCOM (U.S. Army Transportation Research and Development Command), contracted to have a pair of off-road over-land trains, the TC-264 Sno-Buggy, designed specifically for Arctic conditions, to be built by LeTourneau Technologies. The TC-264 Sno-Buggy was the longest off-road vehicle ever built at the time, with its six cars (including the locomotive) measuring a total of 274 feet. Each car was driven by four 7.3 foot-tall wheels and tires. The 24-wheel-drive was powered by two 400 horsepower Cummins diesel engines connected to a hub motor. It had a payload capacity of 150 tons, and could traverse nearly any terrain. It had a very successful first season hauling freight to the DEW Line.  

In 1970, just after the death of the founder, the company was sold to Marathon Manufacturing Company and was renamed Marathon LeTourneau Company.

In 1994, Rowan (now Valaris plc), which had used the company to manufacture its drilling rigs, acquired the company from General Cable for $50 million. 

In 2011, Rowan (now Valaris plc) sold LeTourneau Technologies to Joy Global. Joy Global subsequently sold LeTourneau's Drilling, Marine, and Power divisions to Cameron International.

In 2016, Keppel Corporation acquired LeTourneau Offshore Products (jackups, cranes, and elevating units) from Cameron, while Cameron retained the LeTourneau Drilling Products division.

References

Further reading
  
 
 LeTourneau, R.G. Mover of Men and Mountains, Autobiography (Prentice-Hall 1960, 1967; Reprint Moody Press 1967, 1972), 
 "The LeTourneau Legend", Equipment history,  (Global General Publishing Pty Ltd; 1995, 1998, 3rd revised edition 2007)
 "The LeTourneau Archive", Equipment history,  (Global General Publishing Pty Ltd; 2005)
 "WABCO Australia", LeTourneau Australia history,  (Global General Publishing Pty Ltd; 2007)
 "The WABCO Archive Wheel-Tractor Scrapers", Letourneau-Westinghouse scraper history,  (Global General Publishing Pty Ltd; 2011)

External Links
 
 

1929 establishments in California
Defunct manufacturing companies based in California